Ace Speedway is a 4/10 (.400) mile oval stock car racing track in Altamahaw, North Carolina. The track was constructed by Roy Maddren and opened in 1956 as a 1/3 mile dirt oval. In 1984, the track was expanded to a 3/8 mile dirt oval. In 1990, under the ownership of Fred and Jim Turner, the track was paved and was under the NASCAR Winston Racing Series banner. In 1999, the track was re-expanded to a 4/10 mile paved oval, the pits was expanded and other stuff was added to the track such as new bleachers.

Currently, the track runs Late Models, Limited Sportsman, Modifieds, Mini-Stocks and X-Treme cars on a weekly schedule and has ISCARS, Mini-Cups, Flat Head Fords, Southern Ground Pounders, Mini-Trucks, Legend Cars and Bandoleros on a part-time schedule. Touring series such as CARS Late Model Stock Tour, PASS (Pro All Stars Series SLM), UARA, Rolling Thunder Modifieds as well.

In the past, the speedway hosted NASCAR Whelen Southern Modified Tour and CARS X-1R Pro Cup Series.

Late Model Track Champions

Mischa Sell Memorial 174
The Mischa Sell Memorial race is a 74-Lap main race for Limited Late Model stock cars. The Memorial race was started in 2012 by David Sell to honor his wife's legacy and raise money to help fight cancer. The race is one of the biggest in the area for limited late models.

External links

 
 TRACK CHAMPIONS
Mischa Sell Memorial Race

Sports venues in Alamance County, North Carolina
Motorsport venues in North Carolina
NASCAR tracks
1956 establishments in North Carolina
Sports venues completed in 1956